Trangia is a line of alcohol-burning portable stoves manufactured by Swedish company Trangia AB in Trångsviken. These stoves are designed primarily for backpackers, with a focus on light weight, durability and simple design. The company began in 1925, selling cookware. The Trangia stove was developed by 1951. Trangia stoves were initially preferred to kerosene (paraffin) pressure stoves because they required only one type of fuel (alcohol, usually in the form of cheaper but deliberately poisonous methylated spirit). Trangia's selling point is that the entire packaged stove, including pots, is not significantly larger than a standard camp cooking pot. For this reason the Trangia has retained much of its popularity despite the development of alternative stove fuels and designs.

Components

The standard stove set includes a base, which lifts the burner off the ground and has vents to provide airflow, and a windscreen, which protects the pot and flame (the latter leading to its Swedish nickname, the "stormkök", or "storm kitchen"). The standard stove also includes two billycans (pots), a pot lid/frying pan, an optional kettle and a handle, commonly referred to as a billy grip, used to grip onto the lip of the pots and pans. The entire set is designed to fit together in a single, portable package.

The burner is a small brass cup that looks and functions similar to a beverage-can stove, though it predates aluminium beverage can packaging. A bit of fuel is poured into the burner and ignited. The heat from the flame causes the fuel to vaporize, forcing it out of 23 or 24 jets around the top of the burner, where it ignites and produces a steady cooking flame. The burner includes a removable "simmer ring", which partially blocks the flame in order to reduce heat output and threaded lid.

Alternative burners are available allowing gas cartridges or white gasoline to fuel the Trangia.

Types

The standard stove sets come in several variants, with varying sizes of pots, some with non-stick finishes. A similar burner produced by Trangia is also a component in the Swedish military mess kit. The Finnish Defence Forces use the Trangia, given to soldiers when needed and does not form part of the basic equipment.

There is also a Mini Trangia. It was specially produced for the multi-sport competition KIMM (Karrimor International Mountain Marathon). This consists of a standard burner (with simmer ring), small wind shield, 800 ml (28 fl oz) pot, 15 cm (6") frying pan and pot/pan grip (handle).  The entire package weighs just 330 grams (12 oz), according to Trangia's website. The Mini Trangia is much more portable than the standard-sized Trangia and is even lighter than most liquid-fuelled, pressure stoves (which don't include pots or pans in the weight). However, it is not as windproof as the full-size Trangias.

Originally, Trangia stoves were made entirely from aluminium (except for the burner, which has always been brass), in order to keep them lightweight. However, aluminum makes for a poor cooking surface, as food sticks to it, and it can add odd tastes to certain foods. Later, Trangia introduced Teflon-coated pots and pans. These are better for cooking, though the Teflon is susceptible to flaking off over time. More recently introduced is cookware made from titanium, ultra-light aluminum, anodized ultra-light aluminum, and "Duossal" (a portmanteau of "duo", "stainless steel", and "aluminum"), which is aluminum with a stainless steel cooking surface.

See also
 Portable stove
 Billycan

References

External links 

Trangia official site

Camping equipment
Portable stove manufacturers
Swedish brands